Sabaricus I (served as bishop 866-877) was a medieval Galician clergyman.

External links 

  Official web site of the Diocese of Mondoñedo-Ferrol

9th-century Galician bishops
877 deaths